Rhochmopterum tribullosum is a species of tephritid or fruit flies in the genus Rhochmopterum of the family Tephritidae.

Distribution
Indonesia.

References

Tephritinae
Insects described in 1940
Diptera of Asia